Farnham Maxwell-Lyte  FRSC (sometimes Farnham Maxwell Lyte) (10 January 1828 – 4 March 1906) was an English chemist and the pioneer of a number of techniques in photographic processing. As a photographer he is known for his views of the French Pyrenees.

Early life
Maxwell-Lyte was born on 10 January 1828 in Brixham, Devon, the fifth and last child of Henry Francis Lyte (the author of "Abide with Me") and Anne Maxwell. In 1851, he married Eleanora Julia Bolton (1828–1896), daughter of Cornelius H. Bolton, of Faithlegg, Co. Waterford, with whom he had five children. His son Cecil Henry Maxwell-Lyte married Hon. Mary Lucy Agnes Stourton, daughter of Alfred Joseph Stourton, 24th Baron Segrave and Mary Margaret Corbally, on 4 October 1894.

Maxwell-Lyte was 16 when he first came across photography, hearing the news of William Henry Fox Talbot's invention of the calotype. In 1846, he entered Christ's College, Cambridge, where he graduated BA in chemical engineering in 1851 and MA in 1863. On leaving Cambridge he became a mining engineer and was an Associate of the Society of Civil Engineers and a Fellow of the Chemical Society.

Photography
In 1853, he travelled to Luz-Saint-Sauveur in the Pyrenees on account of his bad health and in 1856 his family joined him. He settled in Pau, and frequented an English circle where he met a group of photographers including John Stewart, Jean-Jacques Heilmann, Pierre Langlumé and Louis Désiré Blanquart-Evrard, who were known as the "Group of Pau". He lived in France from 1853 until 1880. In 1854, he was one of the founders of the Société française de photographie and he was also an Honorary Fellow of the Royal Photographic Society.

Processing
As both a chemist and a photographer, Maxwell-Lyte made many improvements to the technique of photographic processing, working with collodion and wax paper, and introducing a process of his own invention which he called métagélatine; this process was adopted by several photographers and is described, as the "Metagelatine Dry Process", in Wilson's Cyclopedic Photography. In 1854 he wrote up the results of his investigations into what became known as the "honey" process. This was "a method of improving the wet-collodion process by extending the longevity of the sensitized plate" As its name suggests, in this process honey was used both as the preservative solution and in the dusting-in (the 17 June 1854 issue of Notes and Queries contains his description and analysis of his experiments with the process). Maxwell-Lyte's letter appeared a fortnight after George Shadbolt, former editor of the British Photographic Journal, had independently contacted the Photographic Society (now the Royal Photographic Society), giving his description of an identical experiment with honey.

He was one of the pioneers of inserting an imported sky into a landscape photograph to mitigate the problems of sensitivity of the collodion plates, a process that he justified in a letter of 6 November 1861 to the journal Moniteur de la photographie. In the April 1862 issue of the British Journal of Photography he published his findings on the presence of "anti-chlors" in photographic paper, a substance that jeopardised the stability of silver prints. He introduced borax and phosphate toning baths that are still used today, as well as pioneering the use of iodide.

Landscape photography
Maxwell-Lyte took scenic photographs in the period just before commercial photographers started to take and market mass-produced views in the 1860s. According to Dan Younger (in notes for an exhibition of antique photographs at Kenyon College):

Maxwell-Lyte photographed the mountains, villages, waterfalls and bridges of the Pyrenees, often exhibiting his photographs under the auspices of the Société française de photographie. He showed them almost every year from 1855 to 1865 in cities such as London, Glasgow, Edinburgh and Paris, and received several international prizes: he won the silver medal at  1855 Exposition Universelle in Paris, and his Pyrenean landscapes gained him a gold medal in Bordeaux in 1859. He also regularly submitted photographs to the Photographic Society of Scotland's annual exhibition in Edinburgh, sending his entries from his home in Pau and winning silver medals at the 5th exhibition (for Pierrefith) and 7th exhibition (for Lac d'Oo). Despite the thoroughness of his instructions for the transport of his fragile prints from Pau to Scotland, the Daily Scotsman of 26 December 1859 wrote:

Several of his photographs were included in an 1858 volume of Pyrenean views entitled Vues, costumes et monuments des Pyrénées, copies de grands maîtres.

Société Ramond
In 1864 Maxwell-Lyte was among the founders of the Société Ramond, a learned society devoted to the ethnographic and scientific study of the Pyrenees. Although he did not take part in the initial meeting at the hôtel des Voyageurs in Gavarnie attended by Henry Russell, Charles Packe, and Émilien Frossard and his two sons, he attended the second meeting at Frossard's house in Bagnères-de-Bigorre. At this meeting the rules for admittance were laid down, the society was given its name, and executive positions were decided upon; Maxwell-Lyte was chosen as the society's first vice-president. It was on the initiative of the Société Ramond that the observatory on the Pic du Midi de Bigorre was built. Before its construction, Maxwell-Lyte had carried out observations with a large telescope, and made photographs of the eclipse of the sun of 18 July 1860. He also made meteorological readings, determining the average temperature of Bagnères-de-Bigorre over two years of recordings.

Later years
Maxwell-Lyte gave up photography when he moved with his family to Dax. Returning to his original profession as a mining engineer, he bought the sulphur springs of Moudang and a salt mine in Dax, but these were failures. He died suddenly in 1906 at his residence at 60 Finborough Road, South Kensington, London, and was buried at St Mary The Boltons, Kensington. In its review of the year 1906, the British Journal of Photography noted his death and offered the following estimation of his contribution to photographic processing:

References

Bibliography 

 Henri Beraldi, Cent ans aux Pyrénées, Paris, 1898–1904, 7 volumes in octavo. Republished by Les Amis du Livre Pyrénéen, Pau, 1977; then by Librairie des Pyrénées et de Gascogne, Pau, 2001
 Paul Mironeau, Christine Juliat, Lucie Abadia, Pyrénées en images. De l'œil à l'objectif. 1820–1860 (cat. exp.), musée national du Château de Pau, 1996, 128 pp
 Hélène Saule-Sorbé, Les Pyrénées photographiées de Farnham Maxwell Lyte, extrait du Bulletin de la Société Ramond, 2004
 Obituary, The Times, 6 March 1906

External links 
F. Maxwell Lyte fonds at the National Gallery of Canada, Ottawa, Ontario

1828 births
1906 deaths
19th-century English photographers
Alumni of Christ's College, Cambridge
Members of the Société Ramond
British mining engineers
Landscape photographers
Nature photographers
Photography in France
Pioneers of photography
Pyrénéistes
People from Brixham
Fellows of the Chemical Society
Photographers from Devon